The President Andrew Johnson Museum and Library is the presidential library and museum for Andrew Johnson,
located on the Greeneville campus of Tusculum University in Tennessee.

History
In 1840, the number of students at the college was 70. The time had come to expand the campus and construct a new building to replace the second Academy Building. Several citizens, including Johnson himself, donated a total of $4,245.62 for construction of a building that housed classrooms, a chapel, offices, and a library.  The structure was ready for students in October 1841 and was used until 1887.  With the addition of other buildings, Old College served a variety of other purposes such as faculty housing, classroom space and a student dormatory.   In 1993, the structure, known as Old College was restored to its original appearance and renovated to house the Andrew Johnson Collection, along with other related programs.

Today
The building is open from Monday to Friday from 9 am to 5 pm or by appointment.

See also
 Presidential memorials in the United States

Sources

External links

 Andrew Johnson Museum and Library

Museum and Library
Museums in Greene County, Tennessee
Johnson, A
Johnson, Andrew
Presidential museums in Tennessee
Presidency of Andrew Johnson
University museums in Tennessee
Tusculum, Tennessee
Tusculum University